Suwanee is a city in Gwinnett County and a part of the Atlanta metropolitan area in the U.S. state of Georgia. As of the 2010 census, the population was 15,355; this had grown to an estimated 20,907 as of 2019.

Portions of Forsyth and Fulton counties also have Suwanee and its ZIP Code (30024) as a mailing address.

History

Early history
Suwanee, as did most towns in Georgia, started out as a Native American village. It was built on the Chattahoochee River, where societies flourished. The city of Suwanee itself was established and officially recognized by the U.S. government in 1837 upon the erection of a post office. In 1871, the Georgia Air Line Railroad was built through Suwanee, and in 1880 the Rhodes House hotel was built to house passengers of the railroad. This was instrumental in bringing people through the town and helped to generate trade and economic activity. In 1881, a fire burned down all of the buildings on Main Street except for one. From 1880 to 1920, the population saw almost no increase, shifting from 216 people to 241 over the course of 40 years. , the population of Suwanee was over 18,000

Recent history
Beginning in 1933 and ending in 1936, the now heavily traveled Buford Highway was constructed through Suwanee. In 1960, Interstate 85 was built to extend to just south of Suwanee, where it ended at the time. Throughout the last 100 years, several primary education schools have opened in Suwanee, including North Gwinnett High School and Suwanee Elementary School. The first known date for Suwanee High School was 1880, when it was a one-room school house. The first city hall was built in the early 1960s, and the second city hall was built in 1997. In 2005, Town Center was constructed and finished in 2009, at which time the city hall moved to it, where it currently resides. In 2003, Suwanee was named a City of Excellence by the Georgia Municipal Association and Trend Magazine. In 2017, Suwanee was recognized as a Green Community by the Atlanta Regional Commission (ARC) certified at the bronze level for the city's commitment to environmental stewardship and their leadership in sustainability practices.

Geography
Suwanee is located in northern Gwinnett County and southwestern Forsyth County. It is bordered to the northeast by the city of Sugar Hill, to the southwest by the city of Duluth, and on the west by the Chattahoochee River, which serves as the Fulton County border, and across which is the city of Johns Creek.

There are multiple areas with Suwanee postal addresses that are in unincorporated Gwinnett County and in unincorporated Forsyth County; those areas are not in the Suwanee corporate limits.

Climate
Suwanee has a humid subtropical climate (Köppen climate classification Cfa), with mild winters and hot, humid summers.

Demographics

2020 census

As of the 2020 United States census, there were 20,786 people, 7,012 households, and 5,235 families residing in the city.

2010 census
As of 2010, Suwanee had a population of 15,355. The racial and ethnic composition of the population was 67.4% white, 10.8% black or African American, 0.1% Native American, 18.0% Asian, 0.1% Pacific Islander, 1.3% reporting some other race, and 2.3% reporting two or more races.  6.75% of the population was Hispanic or Latino of any race.

2000 census
As of the census of 2000, there were 8,725 people, 2,947 households, and 2,375 families residing in the city. The racial makeup of the city was 84.49% White, 6.38% African American, 0.13% Native American, 6.84% Asian, 0.01% Pacific Islander, 0.72% from other races, and 1.42% from two or more races. Hispanic or Latino of any race were 3.16% of the population.

There were 2,947 households, out of which 46.8% had children under the age of 18 living with them, 71.8% were married couples living together, 6.0% had a female householder with no husband present, and 19.4% were non-families. 14.5% of all households were made up of individuals, and 1.9% had someone living alone who was 65 years of age or older.  The average household size was 2.89 and the average family size was 3.23.

In the city, the population was spread out, with 29.5% under the age of 18, 6.1% from 18 to 24, 39.3% from 25 to 44, 20.7% from 45 to 64, and 4.3% who were 65 years of age or older.  The median age was 34 years. For every 100 females, there were 102.2 males.  For every 100 females age 18 and over, there were 101.8 males.

The median income for a household in the city was $84,038, and the median income for a family was $91,519. Males had a median income of $60,147 versus $40,650 for females. The per capita income for the city was $29,712.  About 1.5% of families and 2.2% of the population were below the poverty line, including 1.2% of those under age 18 and 4.4% of those age 65 or over.

Arts and culture
Gwinnett County Public Library operates the Suwanee Branch in Suwanee.

Sports  
Suwanee was the practicing home of the Atlanta Falcons football team from 1979 to 2001.

Parks and recreation
 Town Center Park is a  park on Buford Highway and Lawrenceville-Suwanee Road. It is the venue for the community's special events, and contains an amphitheater that holds up to 1,000 audience members where numerous concerts and other various performances are held. Town Center Park has Gwinnett County's largest interactive fountain called the "Big Splash". The fountain has 43 jets and uses  of water each minute. The water is recycled. The park lies next to the Suwanee Public Library.
 George Pierce Park is a  park making it the largest in Suwanee. Amenities includes fields for football, baseball, soccer, and softball fields, a fishing pond, hard- and soft-surfaced trails, picnic areas, public restrooms, a playground, outdoor basketball courts, and a senior center.
 Suwanee Creek Greenway is a hard-surfaced multipurpose  trail with wooded areas and wildlife habitat.  It is favored by walkers, joggers, bikers, etc. A spur trail is being added to connect to the Western Gwinnett Bikeway.
 Suwanee Creek Park is an  park commonly used for family picnics and other reunions.  It is connected to the Suwanee Creek Greenway.
 Playtown Suwanee is a super playground built by 1,200 volunteers in 2004.  It is known as "the playground my mommy and daddy built."
 Sims Lake Park was opened in 2008. It consists of a  lake with a looping trail surrounding it.
 Each February, Suwanee hosts the annual Suwanee Half Marathon. This is a qualifier for the Peachtree Road Race.

Pedestrians and cycling
In 2016, Suwanee unveiled the first Bike Share program in Gwinnett County.

The city of Suwanee has released a master plan of existing and proposed trails and sidewalks to connect the community neighborhoods, schools and businesses. Major trails include:

Brushy Creek Greenway
George Pierce Park Red Trail
George Pierce Park Yellow Trail
Ivy Creek Greenway (Under construction)
Suwanee Creek Greenway (Under construction)
Western Gwinnett Bikeway (Under construction)

Education
Suwanee is operated under Gwinnett County Public Schools and primarily served by Collins Hill High School, North Gwinnett High School, and Peachtree Ridge High School. The Philadelphia College of Osteopathic Medicine's Georgia campus is also located in Suwanee.

Infrastructure

Transportation

Major roads and expressways
  Interstate 85
  U.S. Route 23
  State Route 317

Airport
The nearest air service is provided by Hartsfield–Jackson Atlanta International Airport, which is south of Atlanta. The nearest regional airport is Gwinnett County Airport.

References

External links

 
Cities in Georgia (U.S. state)
Cities in Gwinnett County, Georgia
Cities in the Atlanta metropolitan area